–

Kurt-Friedhelm Steinwegs (born December 5, 1960), nicknamed The Monster from Lower Rhine, is a German serial killer who murdered six people between 1974 and 1983.

Childhood 
Kurt-Friedhelm Steinwegs was born as the fifth of eight children of a casual worker and his wife. The mother died in 1970 at the age of only 35 years. After his father looked after the children alone for two years, he invited a female friend to look after the children with him, both living in a marriage-like relationship.

The youngest brother was given for adoption, two brothers were housed in children's homes, and another became a criminal and was detained for it.

Home accommodation 
In November 1974, Steinwegs was housed in a youth centre in Gifhorn, Lower Saxony. During this time he killed 59-year-old Ernst Dorf with a stone, but this was not revealed until years later.

In April 1976, the institution saw no further funding opportunities and requested a transfer for the boy. Eventually, in October 1976 he was housed in a curative education facility in Burglengenfeld, Bavaria. In July 1977, he was released and returned to live with his father in Willich.

Murder of Andrew Robinson 
While living with his father, he murdered 13-year-old Willich resident Andrew Robinson in 1978. In the broadcast of Aktenzeichen XY… ungelöst, the case was reported on June 1, 1979, but no evidence was determined to allow the authorities to track down the perpetrator. Steinwegs was not suspected of the crime.

Arrest and trial 
A little while later, Steinwegs was admitted to the Psychiatric State Hospital in Viersen. During this time, according to later revelations, he killed another four people, including a fellow patient. Among other things, he separated the genitalia from his victims' bodies.

Only in 1984, the police arrested Steinwegs after he had committed another murder. In the interrogations he freely confessed to six homicides. At the trial, however, he recanted his confessions. 
He was later called a "beast" and nicknamed "The Monster from Lower Rhine" by the tabloids due to the brutality of his crimes.

Kurt-Friedhelm Steinwegs was sentenced in 1985 by the district court of 
Mönchengladbach to years of juvenile detention with subsequent preventative detention in a psychiatric institution. He was acquitted in two cases because he was considered not at fault at the time due to "intellectual development errors". To this day, he remains imprisoned in the forensic clinic in Bedburg-Hau.

See also
 List of German serial killers

References 

1960 births
1974 murders in Germany 
1978 murders in Germany
1983 murders in Germany
1984 murders in Germany
Criminals from North Rhine-Westphalia
German serial killers
Living people
Male serial killers
Murder committed by minors
People from Viersen